Wark Bridge is an iron bridge over the River North Tyne at Wark on Tyne in Northumberland, England.

History
The bridge, which replaced a bridge of timber construction, was built by Hawks, Crawshay and Sons of Gateshead and opened in 1878. It underwent a major refurbishment in stages between 2010 and 2015.

References

Bridges in Northumberland
Crossings of the River Tyne